Amber Pate (b. 1995-04-21) is an Australian professional cyclist, part of Cycling Australia and, as of August 2022, the Team BikeExchange–Jayco (women's team).

Early life
Pate was born and raised at Katherine in the Northern Territory. In her youth, she was a keen swimmer.

She undertook university studies in Adelaide, South Australia, switching degrees from nursing, to finance, and then clinical exercise physiology.

Sport
Pate participated in triathlon, and especially enjoyed cycling. She has specialised into the latter sport and competed in velodromes only since 2020.

In August 2022, Pate was selected to Team BikeExchange–Jayco (women's team), an Australian cycling team based in Spain.

Results

2022
 2nd: 2022 - Oceania Continental Championships WE - ITT(CC)
 2nd: 2022 - National championships Australia WE - ITT(NC)

References

Australian female cyclists
Sportswomen from the Northern Territory
Living people
1995 births